The 1990 North Bedfordshire Borough Council election took place on 3 May 1990 to elect members of North Bedfordshire Borough Council in England. This was on the same day as  other local elections.

Summary

Election result

Ward results

Brickhill

Castle

Cauldwell

De Parys

Felmersham

Goldington

Harpur

Harrold

Kempston East

Kempston West

Kingsbrook

Newnham

Oakley

Putnoe

Queens Park

Renhold

Riseley

Wilshamstead

References

Bedford
Bedford Borough Council elections
1990s in Bedfordshire